An Biên is a rural district of Kiên Giang province in the Mekong Delta region of Vietnam. As of 2003 the district had a population of 147,297. The district covers an area of 466 km². The district capital lies at Thứ Ba.

Divisions
The district is divided into one urban municipality and the following communes:

An Biên, Thứ Ba, Nam Thái A, Nam Thái, Tây Yên A, Tây Yên, Hưng Yên, Đông Yên, Nam Yên and Đông Thái.

References

Districts of Kiên Giang province